Emesis tenedia, the falcate metalmark, is a species of metalmark in the butterfly family Riodinidae. It is found in North America.

The MONA or Hodges number for Emesis tenedia is 4401.1.

Subspecies
These three subspecies belong to the species Emesis tenedia:
 Emesis tenedia melancholica Stichel, 1916
 Emesis tenedia ravidula Stichel, 1910
 Emesis tenedia tenedia

References

Further reading

 

Riodininae
Articles created by Qbugbot
Butterflies described in 1861